Le Lamentin 2nd Canton Nord is a former canton in the Arrondissement of Fort-de-France on Martinique. It had 19,066 inhabitants (2012). It was disbanded in 2015. The canton comprised part of the commune of Le Lamentin.

References

Cantons of Martinique